RuralEdge, formerly known as Gilman Housing Trust (an affordable non-profit housing and community-development corporation). The corporation has served the Northeast Kingdom for over 30 years with their main focus being to strengthen homes and communities in and around the Northeast Kingdom.

History

Since its first affordable housing project in 1986, RuralEdge has created sustainable housing throughout the Northeast Kingdom for families, seniors, those with disabilities, and all who seek a place to call home. From the new construction of multi-family properties or senior housing to acquisition and rehabilitation of needed affordable family housing, RuralEdge has successfully contributed to the addition of over 600 housing units in our three counties.

In 1998, RuralEdge became a Chartered Member of the NeighborWorks America Network, bringing new resources, knowledge, and access to the residents across the Northeast Kingdom.  Our NeighborWorks HomeOwnership Center continues to provide nationally certified pre-purchase education and counseling for homebuyers along with financial education services. A Home Repair Program serves low and moderate-income borrowers in making home repairs for health, safety, and accessibility issues.

RuralEdge has expanded our mission and services offered by participating in the nationally recognized SASH (Supports And Services at Home) program and is a NeighborWorks Community Building and Engagement participant.  These programs assist individuals and resident groups in acquiring support for special needs, crisis intervention, relocations, and advocacy issues—helping ensure that beyond the brick and mortar, our residents are equipped to sustain their housing choice.

Leadership

Patrick Shattuck has been the Executive Director of RuralEdge since 2019.

Departments

Real Estate Development

This team is responsible for the redevelopment and rehabilitation of the existing portfolio, as well as creating additional units to serve the needs of the Northeast Kingdom. Of their many projects, the largest is the redevelopment of New Avenue, formerly the Depot Square Apartments, in St. Johnsbury, which will create 40 units of affordable housing for families, seniors, those with disabilities, as well as units designated for those exiting homelessness.

Community Development

This team is responsible for the administration of the Support and Services at Home (SASH) Program, as well as the Neighborworks Community Building & Engagement (CB&E) Program, communications, and outreach. The goal of this department is to support our residents in their housing choice, keeping them safely in their homes as long as possible, developing the communities at our developments, as well as advocating for the Northeast Kingdom at the state level in the housing needs of our three counties.

Homeownership Center

As a Neighborworks Organization (NWO), RuralEdge operates a Homeownership Center (HOC) aimed at supporting individuals and families attain homeownership, as well as helping low to moderate income homeowners make necessary repairs to their homes. This is accomplished through a monthly Homebuyer Education Workshop, which walks prospective homebuyers through the process of purchasing a home and looking at their current financial readiness for a mortgage, and through the Revolving Loan Fund Home Repair Program, which offers grant and low-interest loans to low to moderate income homeowners make necessary health and safety repairs to their homes, mostly in the form of roof repair, well repair and septic repair. The HOC is vital to the housing market, as it prepares people for homeownership which, in turn, takes a burden off of the rental market.

Property Management

RuralEdge currently owns and operates a portfolio of over 600 affordable rental units, as well as some commercial units. These units are spread across the three counties that make up the Northeast Kingdom. They employ five property managers, four compliance personnel, and nearly a dozen maintenance technicians to keep the 33 properties in the portfolio running efficiently and sustainably. For most of 2021, the residential vacancy rate has been at about three percent, with most of those units processing prospective tenants at any given time.

Finance

RuralEdge rebranded in 2013 from Gilman Housing Trust, and is now RuralEdge dba Gilman Housing Trust. As such, the finance department handles the internal operations of Gilman Housing Trust, Inc (dba RuralEdge), as well as the financial operations of each property, most of which are single asset LLCs (i.e. Scenic View in Westfield, Vermont is legally known as RuralEdge Scenic View LLC).

List of Properties

 Crystal Lake Housing, Barton 
 Coventry Senior Housing, Coventry 
 Johns River Apartments, Derby & Derby Line 
 Derby Line Gardens, Derby Line 
 Gilman Senior Housing, Gilman 
 Glover Housing, Glover 
 Clarks Landing, Groton 
 Groton Community Housing, Groton 
 The Meadows, Irasburg 
 Olivia Place, Lyndonville 
 Mathewson Block Housing, Lyndonville 
 Marigold Apartments, Lyndonville 
 Maple Ridge Mobile Home Park, Lyndonville 
 The Darling Inn, Lyndonville 
 599 Main Street, Lyndonville 
 Parkview Apartments, Newport 
 Newport Senior Housing, Newport 
 Lakeview Housing, Newport 
 Lakebridge Housing, Newport 
 Governor Prouty Apartments, Newport 
 Governors Mansion Apartments, Newport 
 Shattuck Hill Mobile Home Park, Newport 
 Rainbow Apartments, Orleans 
 Lind Homes, South Ryegate 
 1867 Building, St. Johnsbury 
 Caledonia Housing, St. Johnsbury 
 Hilltop Family Housing, St. Johnsbury 
 Moose River Housing, St. Johnsbury 
 Mountain View Housing, St. Johnsbury 
 Passumpsic View Apartments, St. Johnsbury

Notes

External links

Community development organizations
Local government in Vermont
Northeast Kingdom, Vermont
Non-profit organizations based in Vermont
1973 establishments in Vermont
Affordable housing
Housing organizations in the United States